Razia Jan, born in Afghanistan is the founder of Razia's Ray of Hope Foundation, a nonprofit education organization in Afghanistan.

Career and Charity Work
Jan moved to the United States in 1970. The proprietor of a small tailoring business in Duxbury, Massachusetts, she served as president of the town's Rotary Club.

After September 11, 2001, Jan rallied her New England community to send over 400 homemade blankets to rescue workers at Ground Zero. Her efforts expanded to include sending care packages to US troops in Afghanistan. Through her involvement in the military's Operation Shoe Fly, she coordinated the delivery of over 30,000 pairs of shoes to needy Afghan children.

References 

Humanitarians
Living people
Year of birth missing (living people)